7 RCR...Projecting India's Future is an Indian television politics-based reality series/documentary series, hosted by Indian author, columnist, and speaker Chetan Bhagat on Hindi news channel ABP News, which premiered on 11 January 2014. This is a show of dramatized biographies of all those who have the mettle to make it to 7 Race Course Road, the Prime Minister's official residence, presented in the most interesting manner. It aims to bring to the audience the never seen before facts of Indian history. The 7 RCR show started immediately after the much critically acclaimed Pradhanmantri (TV Series) hosted by Shekhar Kapur. 7 RCR is a show in lead up to 2014 Indian general election. Raghi Papiya Joshi and Sohan Thakur are casting Directors of the show. It showed 8 possible candidates for PM of India. The series is re-launched post-election with episodes on Narendra Modi's journey to 7RCR on 24 May 2014.

Cast

Sushil Parashar as Ambalal Khosti, RSS Pracharak
Navni Parihar as Indira Gandhi
Mohit Chauhan as Rajiv Gandhi
Dharmesh Tiwari as Jaswant Singh
Suzanne Bernert as Sonia Gandhi
 Kartik Soni as Rahul Gandhi
Sangam Rai as Narendra Modi

Episodes

Episode URLs

Reception

Social media
The show noticed a huge engagement on social media with the #7RCR trending on Twitter for over 4 days in India on its launch. The hashtag was promoted heavily by ABP News through running contest on Twitter started on 18 January 2014. The lucky winners of the #7RCR contest were given iPad Mini. Following the 7RCR's success, Aaj Tak started a documentary series named Aandolan, which is narrated by Om Puri.

Controversies
The producer of this series, ABP News, came under controversy over showing Arvind Kejriwal under negative light. Use of language on defining every aspect of his life has been overly negative. Arvind Kejriwal himself tweeted about his surprise over the episode on his life. ABP News itself in under criticism for producing biased news..

On the contrary, ABP News has appealed to Arvind Kejriwal to tell about the 'fictional' part of the show and has mentioned that he will be given space to clarify his stand.

See also
 Pradhanmantri (TV Series)
 Samvidhaan (TV Series)
 Bharatvarsh (TV Series)

External links 

 7RCR Contest
 7RCR website on ABP News

References

ABP News original programming
Hindi-language television shows
Indian reality television series
Indian documentary television series
Cultural depictions of prime ministers of India
Indian political television series
Cultural depictions of Rajiv Gandhi
Cultural depictions of Narendra Modi
Cultural depictions of Indira Gandhi
2004 in Indian television
Rahul Gandhi
Kejriwal government
Nitish Kumar
Jayalalithaa
Jaswant Singh
Nehru–Gandhi family